Chung Wui Mansion is a composite building in Wan Chai District, Hong Kong. Its address is 76A-176D Johnston Road. It was completed in 1964.

Characteristics 
Floor Count: 16
Completed: 1964
Architect: Ping K. Ng
Type: Composite building
Use: Residential, commercial, and industrial
Corner Type: Rounded, making it a corner building.
Architecture: 20th-century modern architecture

See also 
Corner Houses
Composite Building
Modern Architecture

References 

Buildings and structures in Hong Kong